Keijo Tapiovaara (born 18 May 1939) is a Finnish speed skater. He competed in three events at the 1960 Winter Olympics.

References

1939 births
Living people
Finnish male speed skaters
Olympic speed skaters of Finland
Speed skaters at the 1960 Winter Olympics
Sportspeople from Tampere